The 2018 German Figure Skating Championships was held on December 14–16, 2017 at the Eissporthalle Frankfurt in Frankfurt. Skaters competed in the disciplines of men's singles, ladies' singles, pair skating, ice dance, and synchronized skating on the senior, junior, and novice levels. The results of the national championships were among the criteria used to choose the German teams to the 2018 World Championships and 2018 European Championships.

Medalists

Senior

Junior

Senior results

Men

Ladies

Pairs

Ice dance

Synchronized

Junior results

Men

Ladies

Pairs

Ice dance

Synchronized

External links 
 2018 German Championships: Senior results at the Deutsche Eislauf Union
 2018 German Junior Championships: Junior, youth, and novice results at the Deutsche Eislauf Union
 2018 German Championships at the Deutsche Eislauf Union

German Championships
German Figure Skating Championships
Figure Skating Championships